Grant Township is a township in Clinton County, Iowa, USA.  As of the 2000 census, its population was 287.

Geography
According to the USGS, it contains two cemeteries: Pine Hill and Saint Columbkille.

References
 USGS Geographic Names Information System (GNIS)

External links
 US-Counties.com
 City-Data.com

Townships in Clinton County, Iowa
Townships in Iowa